The 1912 Chinese provisional presidential election were the elections held on 15 February and 20 February 1912 in Nanjing for the second provisional President and Vice President of China.

After the Wuchang Uprising on 10 October 1911, Yuan Shikai, the powerful military officer was reappointed to lead the Beiyang Army by the Qing court. Yuan realized that Manchu's days were numbered and decided to establish a government himself. He attacked the revolutionaries to show his power, however left the negotiations open. After the revolutionaries promised him the presidency, he pressed the Qing court to abdicate. On 12 February 1912, the court authorized Yuan to organize a provisional republican government. Three days later, the incumbent provisional president Sun Yat-sen resigned and urged the National Assembly to elect Yuan.

Yuan Shikai and Li Yuan-hung were elected as President and Vice-President respectively. Yuan sworn in on 10 March 1912 and moved to government to Beijing.

Results

President

Vice-President

See also
 History of Republic of China
 President of the Republic of China
 Vice President of the Republic of China

Citations

References
 中央選舉委員會，中華民國選舉史，台北：中央選舉委員會印行，1987年

Presidential elections in the Republic of China (1912–1949)
1912 in China
China
Uncontested elections
February 1912 events